The 1796 United States presidential election in Vermont took place between November 4 and December 7, 1796, as part of the 1796 United States presidential election. The state legislature chose four representatives, or electors to the Electoral College, who voted for President and Vice President.

During this election, Vermont cast four electoral votes for Vice President and New England native John Adams.

See also
 United States presidential elections in Vermont

References

Vermont
1796
1796 Vermont elections